Satu Mic may refer to several places in Romania:

 Satu Mic, a village in Șilindia Commune, Arad County
 Satu Mic, a village in Lupeni Commune, Harghita County
 Satu Mic, a village in Craidorolț Commune, Satu Mare County
 Victor Vlad Delamarina, Timiș, a commune in Timiș County, formerly called Satu Mic